Milojević is a Serbian surname derived from a masculine given name Miloje. Notable people with the surname include:

 Aleksa Milojević (born 2000), Serbian footballer
 Dejan Milojević (born 1977), Serbian basketball player
 Goran Milojević (born 1964), Serbian football midfielder
 Ljubiša Milojević (born 1967), Serbian football player
 Miloje Milojević (1884-1946), Serbian composer, conductor, pianist, pedagogue, music critic, and musical writer
 Miloš Milojević (lawyer) (1840-1897), Serbian lawyer, writer and politician
 Miloš Milojević (footballer) (born 1982), Serbian footballer and manager
 Nemanja Milojević (born 1998), Greek-Serbian footballer
 Nikola Milojević (born 1981), Serbian football goalkeeper
 Nikola Milojević (born 1995), Serbian tennis player
 Vladan Milojević (born 1970), Serbian footballer and manager
 Zvonko Milojević (born 1971), Serbian football player

Serbian surnames
Slavic-language surnames
Patronymic surnames